Paul Perry is the co-author of several New York Times bestsellers, including Evidence of the Afterlife, Closer to the Light, Transformed by the Light, and Saved by the Light which was made into a popular movie by Fox. His books have been published in more than 30 languages around the world and cover a wide variety of subjects from near-death experiences to biographies of authors Ken Kesey and Hunter S. Thompson.

Perry is also a documentary filmmaker and owns PAUL PERRY Productions, a film production company, in Paradise Valley, Arizona. His writing and film making earned him a knighthood in the Royal Family of Portugal where he is a Knight Commander in the Order of Saint Michael of the Wing and the official filmmaker of the Portuguese Royal House.

Early life and education 
Perry is a graduate of Arizona State University and has an MFA from Antioch University (Los Angeles). He was also fellow at the Gannett Center for Media Studies at Columbia University in New York City and taught magazine writing at the University of Oregon in Eugene, Oregon.

Career

Early career 
He went on to become Executive Editor at American Health magazine, a winner of the National Magazine Awards for General Excellence.

In 1981, Paul went to China with author Ken Kesey (One Flew Over the Cuckoo's Nest (novel)) to cover the First International Beijing Marathon for Running Magazine, for which he was editor. The two spent a month traveling on a bus through China. Upon their return, Kesey and Perry began discussing the possibility of compiling a book of photographs from Kesey's famous bus trip across the United States, known as The Kool Aid Acid Trip. Kesey agreed to give Perry access to his photo archives. Perry joined forces with Ken Babbs, Kesey's sidekick, to produce On the Bus: The Complete Guide to the Legendary Bus Trip of Ken Kesey and the Merry Pranksters and the Birth of the Counterculture. The book is a photo documentary of the Acid Trip that tells the story of the birth of the psychedelic era through interviews with Allen Ginsberg, Timothy Leary, members of the Grateful Dead, and others.

Perry followed with Fear and Loathing: The Strange and Terrible Saga of Hunter S. Thompson, a biography of the late Gonzo journalist. Much of the biography was based on several months spent together working on The Curse of Lono, a book that sprang from an article on the Honolulu Marathon published in Running, a magazine edited by Perry.

The book was unauthorized and angered Thompson, who declared Perry was "stealing my material." Later, in Entertainment Weekly, Thompson gave the book the highest grade of all biographies written about him at that time.

Near-death studies and further writing 

In 1986 Perry's interest in the effects and meaning of near-death experiences led him to a professional involvement with Raymond Moody, M.D., Ph.D., considered to be the founder of near-death studies. The two have written six books together (Paranormal, Glimpses of Eternity, The Light Beyond, Coming Back, Reunions and Paranormal.) He co-authored with Jeffrey Long, MD Evidence of the Afterlife and "God And The Afterlife. All told he has written or co-written 15 books on the subject of near-death experiences, five of which have become New York Times bestsellers.

In 2001, only weeks after the 9/11 attack on the World Trade Center in New York, Perry went to Egypt to follow the trail of Jesus in Egypt. This is a trail that follows ancient sites and artifacts and is believed by Christians and Muslims alike to be the route followed by the Holy Family as they fled from the soldiers of King Herod.

Perry spent two months on the trail, which runs from the Egyptian border with Israel, through the Delta and south to Assiut, which is about 150 miles below Cairo. He stopped at more than 30 sites believed to have been visited by the Holy Family, including monasteries built around a stone believed to be the bed of baby Jesus and an area where bright lights that flash from the sky attract tens of thousands of people from all over Africa. He is both the first and second Westerner to complete the entire Holy Family Trail.

Perry wrote Jesus in Egypt upon his return, a book praised for its stories of the people of Egypt by Booklist, and lauded by Publishers Weekly.

Documentary films 

When his book Jesus in Egypt was published, a television producer approached Perry and offered to fund a documentary film of the Egypt journey. Perry returned to Egypt with a camera crew in 2004 and followed the trail a second time to make a documentary film. The film, Jesus, the Lost Years was premiered at the Cairo Opera House in 2005 to members of the Mubarak family and more than 1500 others, including Egyptian cabinet members, ambassadors and Saudi princes.

Mrs. Mubarak expressed great admiration for the film in the Egyptian press, and admitted that it showed "an Egypt I have never seen." She agreed to let the film be sold in Egypt under the condition that the name of Jesus not appear in the title to avoid inflaming Muslim radicals. As a result the film was released in the Middle East under the title The Holy Family in Egypt.

The making of Jesus, the Lost Years led Perry to start a documentary film production company, Sakkara Productions, which is named after the first stone pyramid. He also started a second film production company, Paul Perry Productions.

Perry's next documentary, Visions and Miracles: Out of the Land of Egypt contains never-before seen footage of visions and miracles that have taken place in modern day Egypt, including Marian apparitions near Cairo that tens of thousands of people have witnessed.

Filmography 

AFTERLIFE, tackles the fascinating subject of near-death experiences and interviews scientists who have researched proof of a life after death. It also features a number of people who have died and returned to tell stories of what they experienced on the brink of death.

"Dali's Greatest Secret," about a secret painting of artist Salvador Dalí that changed his life yet was hidden underneath a nun's bed for nearly 30 years. The film won honorable mention at film festivals in Berlin, Madrid, and Nevada and has been shown at theaters, museums and art galleries internationally.

"The Secret Mummies of Lisbon," tackles the bizarre excavation of 78 mummies concealed and forgotten in a Lisbon church. Done at the request of the Catholic church, the expedition shown a light on life in early Portugal.

"The Light Beyond," is a talkumentary with Raymond Moody, MD, Phd, whose research into near-death experiences both defined and named the phenomenon.

"Secrets and Lies of Christopher Columbus," to be released in 2019, is a well-sourced and controversial documentary containing solid evidence that explorer Christopher Columbus was not Italian but the bastard child of Portuguese royalty whose mother was Jewish and father a Duke. The movie reveals new evidence that he was a secret agent for King John II of Portugal who helped convince the pope to rearrange the map of the world, giving Portugal claim to Brazil, a country they had secretly discovered. The movie includes revealing interviews with the Duke of Braganza, Christopher Columbus XX, Vasco da Gama XIX, and  historians and Dr. Jose Lorenta, a noted DNA scientist.

Honours 
In September 2011, Perry was Knighted in Portugal by the Duke of Braganza for his film and book work. He is the official filmmaker of the Portuguese Royal House where he is also a Grand Cross knight. Perry was also made a Knight Commander in Santiago, Spain, by the Bishop of Sao Tome, a Brotherhood that stems from the ancient Order of Saint James, the oldest order of knighthood on the Iberian Peninsula.
  Royal House of Portugal: Knight Commander of the Order of Saint Michael of the Wing (september 2011)

Personal life 

Perry is married to Darlene Perry and has three children.

References

External links
 Author Website
 Amazon Page
 Films

American non-fiction writers
Year of birth missing (living people)
Living people
Arizona State University alumni
Antioch University alumni
Columbia University fellows
Place of birth missing (living people)